The Matthias Hansen House, formerly also known as the Schoustrup House is a Renaissance-style townhouse on Amagertorv (No. 6) in central Copenhagen, Denmark. Built in 1616, it is one of few buildings of its kind which has survived the Copenhagen Fires of 1728 and 1795. The building is now home to a flagship store for the Royal Copenhagen porcelain factory.

History

17th century
The house was built in 1616 for Matthias Hansen, who was a member of the city council and later served as mayor of Copenhagen from 1622 until his death in 1626.  Hansen's daughter, Kirsten Madsdatter, was one of Christian IV's mistresses and mother of Christian Ulrik Gyldenløve. Later residents include the composer Emil Hartmann, who lived there first in 1846 and again in 1852.

Marie Fuiren acquired the building in 1677. She was the daughter of Archbishop Hans Svane. Her property was listed in Copenhagen's first cadastre of 1689 as No. 4 in Frimand's Quarter. In 1693, it pased to their daughters,  Anne Margrethe and Søster Svane, who were both widows at that time. Anne Margrethe Svane was the daughter of city doctor (stadsphysicus) Jens Foss. Søster Svane was the widow of bishop Hans Bagger.

18th century

The next owner of the property was wine merchant Johan Sohl. He was a member of the Council of 32 Men. On his death in 1727 it was sold to Andreas Matthiesen and partners. The next owner was Johan Henrik Syling, a brother-in-law of Johan Sohl. The building was one of very few buildings in the area to survive the Copenhagen Fire of 1728.

Privy Councillor Otto von Blom acquired the building in 1731. In 1738, it was acquired by Anna Sophie Schack.

Justice Minister and bank commissioner Gregorius Klauman acquired the property in 1740. In was after his death in 1752 passed to his son, Knud Gregorius de Klauman, who served as mayor of Copenhagen. His property was listed in the new cadastre of 1756 as No. 3 in Frimand's Quarter. 

His widow Ulrikke Sophie de Klauman sold the property to wholesale merchant Christian Hansen. He kept it for more than 30 years, from 1763 until 1795.

The property was home to 31 resudents in five households at the 1787 census. The ownern resided in the building with his wife Mariane Valeue, their four-year-old daughter Charlotte Hansen, three office clerks, a coachman(caretaker, a female cook, a nanny and a maid. Christian Albrecht Fabricius (1734-1715), General-Administrator of Tal-Lotteriet, resided in the building with his wife Margretha Friderica Sckreek, their three children (aged eight to 17), a female cook, a male servant and a maid. Johan Henrich Meincke, another emloyee at Tal-Lotteriet, resided in the building with his wife Marie Tronsen and one maid. Rasmus Hansen West, a fishmonger, resided in the building with his wife Christiana Christen Datter and their 19-year-old daughter. Christian Stavanger, a greengrocer, resided in the building with his wife Ellen Kirstine, their four-year-old daughter, his 76-year-old mother and one maid.

Schoustrup family, 1795-1872

Jens Schoustrup acquired the building in 1795. His old property in Vestergade had just been destroyed in the Copenhagen Fire of 1795. He established a vinegar manudactory in the building in 1797. His property was again listed in the new cadastre of 1806 as No. 3 in Frimand's Quarter.

The property was home to 32 residents in five households at the 1801 census. Jens Schoustrup	resided in the building with his wife Anne Kirstine Horn, their four children (aged eight to 15), three employees, three male servants and two maids. Corfitz Fischer, a board member of the Royal Danish Mail (Dequteret i Post Amtet), resided in the building with his wife Cathrine Sønderborg, his sister-in-law Cathrine Sønderborg and two maids. Christen Hansen, the former now retired owner, resided in the building with his wife Mariane Waleur	 and one maid. Jon Kinderling, an inspector at Klæde Oplaget (Textile Storage), resided in the building with his wife Friderica Stetzer and one maid. Niels Bolsmann, a fishmonger, resided in the building with his wife Cecilia Bentsen, their two children (aged two and four), a maid and a caretaker.

On 27 January 1809, Schoustrup purchased the country house Oliegren on Amager as a purely speculative investment On 4 February 1812, he sold most of the Oliegren estate to Jacob Golm. Ge onlu kept a small house on a 1m799 square alen lot.

In 1814, Schoustrup ceded the property to his sons Peter Schoustrup, and Johan Henrik Schoustrup.  Peter Schoustrup's death 1717 left Johan Henrik Schoustrup was the sole owner of the enterprise. Shortly prior to his own death, in 1844, he chose to cede it to his eldest son  Peter Jacob Schoustrup.

Hafnia
The insurance company Hafnia acquired the building in 1872 and made it their headquarters. Architect Hans Jørgen Holm refurbished the building in 1898 and a café designed by Thorvald Bindesbøll opened on the ground floor the following year.

Toyal Porcelain Factory
In 1912, Hafnia relocated to a new building on the corner of Holmens Kanal and Holbergsgade in Gammelholm. The building on Amagertorv was then taken over by the porcelain manufacturer Aluminia, which was merged with Royal Copenhagen in 1962.

 Architecture 

The building consists of three storeys and a cellar and stands in blank red brick with sandstone decorations.  The facade is six bays wide and topped by a double Dutch gable. The gateway opens to a courtyard space which affords access to a rear wing and a connecting wing. The octagonal staircase tower in the courtyard is a reconstruction of a staircase tower which was demolished in 1731.

List of owners
 1616–1628: Matthias Hansen
 1628–ca. 1660: Ingeborg Leiel Frederiksdatter (widow)
 ca. 1660–1663: Hans Matthiassen Mechlenburg (son)
 1663–1666: Margrethe Rosenmeyer Henriksdatter (widow)
 1666–1670: Ingeborg Margrethe Mechlenburg, married to Royal Commissioner Frants Müller from Gundetved, who became owner through marriage
 1670–1677: Diderik Schult, Privy Councillor, executive secretary for the Danish chancellery, etc.
 1677–1677: Gerhard Schrøder, nephew of Peder Schumacher Griffenfeld's mother
 1677–1693: Marie Fuiren, widow of Archbishop Hans Svane
 1693–unknown: Anne Margrethe Svane (daughter), widow of council advisor and city doctor Jens Foss (died 1687), and Søster Svane (daughter), widow of bishop Hans Bagger
 unknown–1727: Johan Sohl, wine merchant, one of the assembly of 32 Men mentioned in Ludvig Holberg's comedy Den vægelsindede''. He was married to a sister of the later-mentioned Johan Henrik Syling and presumably died in 1727, when the house was sold
 1727–unknown: Andreas Matthiesen and co-interests
 unknown–1731: Johan Henrik Syling, commerce minister, brother-in-law of Johan Sohl. On the same occasion, the sale of a garden plot belonging to the property probably took place in January 1728. As it seems, the farm was sold again in 1731 after a claim from a mortgagee, Andreas Brun.
 1731–1738: Otto von Blome, Privy Councillor
 1738–1740: Anna Sophie Schack, widowed countess
 1740–1752: Gregorius Klauman, Justice Minister and bank commissioner, etc., later honorary council of state
 1752–1762: Knud Gregorius de Klauman, mayor, etc. (son)
 1762–1763: Ulrikke Sophie de Klauman (widow)
 1763–1795: Christian Hansen, wholesaler, one of the 32 Men
 1795–1814: Jens Schoustrup, wholesaler
 1814–1818: Peter Schoustrup, wholesaler, and Johan Henrik Schoustrup, grocer (sons)
 1818–1844: Johan Henrik Schoustrup
 1844–1872: Peter Jacob Schoustrup, wholesaler and vinegar brewer (son)
 1872–1912: The insurance company Hafnia
 1912–1997: The royal porcelain factory, now Royal Copenhagen
 1997–present: Royal Scandinavia

References

External links 
 

 Schoustrups eddikebryggeri

Houses in Copenhagen
Listed residential buildings in Copenhagen
Houses completed in 1616
Renaissance architecture in Copenhagen
1616 establishments in Denmark